John Feild may refer to:

John Feild (Puritan)
John Feild (proto-Copernican)

See also
John Field (disambiguation)